Miska Likarnia is a station on the Kryvyi Rih Metrotram. Opened on 19 May 2001, it is currently the newest one in the system. The station was built into an existing track between the stations of Sonyachna and Vechirniy bulvar in the interests of serving the microraions of Skhidnyi and Sonyachnyi, which lacked the tram access nearby. It is named after the central municipal hospital, which is located 500 meters from the station.

The station demonstrates another of the system's massive advantage over a traditional Metro system, the ease at which a station can be built into an existing track. In the original plans there was no provision for the station, however, the tracks in the area are very straight and there are a number of subways that were built back in 1980s under the tram lines. It was decided the subway would be converted, and the station would be built around it, with two side platforms. As there was no perfect symmetry between the portals of the subway and its distance to the future platforms, the tracks had to be slightly moved eastwards to make room for the western platform. 

In addition, the subway was "extended" through glazed pavilions to make room for platform leading staircases and turnstiles. In the interests of cost-saving, the platforms were made shorter and narrower than the standard sizes of other stations. Also the metal canopy which hinges over does not extend far enough to actually provide adequate protection from the weather elements. The overall effect made the appearance resemble more of a terminal bus stop than that of a Metrotram station.

See also
 Druha Miska Likarnia (Kryvyi Rih Metrotram)

External links
 Mir Metro - Description and photos
Google maps - Satellite shot.

Kryvyi Rih Metrotram stations